The Dominion Arboretum is an arboretum part of the Central Experimental Farm of Agriculture and Agri-Food Canada in Ottawa, Ontario, Canada. Carleton University is located at the opposite side of the Canal. At a latitude of 45°, it can experience extremely hot and humid summers and extremely cold winters.

It displays a wide range of well-established trees and shrubs with the intention of evaluating their hardiness, including 1,700 different species and varieties. The arboretum is open from dawn to dusk and the admission is free.

Although the climate of the Ottawa area is Zone 5a, the topography of the Arboretum produces a microclimate and is warmer by one zone. This has allowed for a collection of magnolias, azaleas, and several other fringe trees including Metasequoia and Liriodendron.

One of the favourite attractions for tourists is the Ornamental Gardens. In this area are located the annual plant display, perennial borders, lilac walks, roses and hedges. The hedge collection was planted between 1966 and 1968 and contains a variety of species suitable for use as a hedge.

See also
List of botanical gardens in Canada

References

Hinchcliff, R. and R. Popadiouk. 2007. For the love of trees: A guide to the trees of Ottawa's Central Experimental Farm Arboretum. General Store Publishing House, Renfrew, Ontario, Canada.

External links 

Information from the Central Experimental Farm
Map of the nut trees of the Dominion Arboretum
 Douglas, B. (editor). 2005. The living collection of the Dominion Arboretum. Agriculture and Agri-Food Canada, Ottawa

Botanical gardens in Canada
Arboreta in Canada
Parks in Ottawa